MKM may refer to:

 Mariborska kolesarska mreža, cycling network, NGO promoting cycling in Maribor, Slovenia
Mathematical knowledge management
MKM Educational Trust
MKM steel
Mukah Airport IATA code
Museum Küppersmühle
Melksham railway station station code
Sukhoi Su-30MKM